HelgelandsKraft is a power company that serves Helgeland in Norway. It owns eight hydro electric Power Plants with average annual production of 678 GWh as well as the power grid in the fourteen municipalities of Helgeland, that also own the company. It also operates district heating in Mo i Rana and a private equity company.

The company is owned by the municipalities of Alstahaug (10,1%), Brønnøy (9,6%), Dønna (4,4%), Grane (2,5%), Hattfjelldal (2,5%), Hemnes (7,0%), Herøy (3,8%), Leirfjord (3,2%), Nesna (4,6%), Rana (26,8%), Sømna (3,2%), Vefsn (18,3%), Vega (2,8%) and Vevelstad (1,2%).

History
The companies roots date back to 1895 when Båsmo Gruber installed the district's first electric generator. In 1907 the first hydroelectric power plant was built in Helgeland, at Revelfossen in Tverråga. Through a number of mergers between the various municipal power companies AL Helgeland Kraftlag was created in 1964. Because of new regulations in the 1990s it was transformed to a limited company.

Power plants
 Sjona Power Plant, 224 GWh
 Grytåga Power Plant, 240 GWh
 Fagervollan Power Plant, 56 GWh
 Kaldåga Power Plant, 62 GWh
 Forsland Power Plant, 28 GWh
 Langfjord Power Plant, 33 GWh
 Ildgrubfossen Power Plant, 28 GWh
 Andåsfossen Power Plant, 6,5 GWh

References 

Electric power companies of Norway
Companies owned by municipalities of Norway
Companies based in Vefsn
Energy companies established in 1964
1964 establishments in Norway
Rana, Norway